Dicrastylis costelloi is a species of plant within the genus, Dicrastylis, in the family Lamiaceae.  It is found in Western Australia, South Australia, the Northern Territory and Queensland.

Description
Dicrastylis costelloi is a shrub, growing to about 40 cm high on red sands. Its stems are roughly circular in cross section with no peltate scales. The opposite and entire leaves are 8-25 mm long by 3.2-6 mm wide, and have branched (dendritic) hairs. There are bracteoles (1-2 mm long), and bracts (5-9 mm long. The flowers are sessile. The calyx has five lobes (1.5 mm long), covered in dendritic hairs, and the white or cream corolla is 4.5-5 mm long, with no dots or stripes in its throat. There are five stamens. In Western Australia it flowers in October.

Taxonomy
It was first described by Frederick Manson Bailey in 1891 as Dicrastylis costelloi. The type specimen was collected "near  Lake Nash, on the boundary line between Queensland and the Northern Territory of South Australia" by M. Costello whom the species epithet honours. An isotype (MB0011041108) collected by Costello at Lake Nash is held at the British Museum.

Gallery

References

costelloi
Endemic flora of Western Australia

Plants described in 1891
Eudicots of Western Australia
Taxa named by Frederick Manson Bailey